Scotland Hotel is a historic hotel building located at Scotland, Taylor Township, Greene County, Indiana.  It was built in 1879, and is a two-story, frame building with a rear section dated to the mid-1860s.  It has a hipped roof and features a full width, one-story front porch with Italianate style design elements.

It was listed on the National Register of Historic Places in 1993.

References

Hotel buildings on the National Register of Historic Places in Indiana
Italianate architecture in Indiana
Hotel buildings completed in 1879
Buildings and structures in Greene County, Indiana
National Register of Historic Places in Greene County, Indiana